Chopy Shakir Fatah (born June 10, 1983) is a contemporary Kurdish singer. She was born in Kirkuk, Iraq.

Career
Her family emigrated to the Netherlands in 1988. She released her first album titled Çît Naw Binêm in 2003. After emigrating to the Netherlands, she joined a Dutch choir school in 1990 and also attended a music school in 1996 where she focused on singing under the supervision of her teachers. In 1999, she attended the Kurdish Music Academy in Germany where she studied under the supervision of the Kurdish music teacher Wirya Ahmad. She performed on stage for the first time in The Hague, Netherlands in 2000. Chopy has released a total of 5 Kurdish music albums and 3 English singles "Draw the Line", "My Homeland" and "Think of Me".

Chopy has been interviewed by many Kurdish and Iraqi newspapers and magazines, as well as by newspapers from Turkey (Habertürk), Dutch newspapers Algemeen Dagblad, NRC Next, Trouw, Nederlands Dagblad and the Italian weekly women's fashion and celebrity gossip magazine Grazia. The Dutch current affairs TV programmes EénVandaag and Goudmijn made reports about Chopy's life. She has also performed in Jörgen Raymanns TV show 'Zo Raymann' (Raymanns Suikerfeest).

In 2008 Chopy became the cultural Ambassador of Asiacell Telecom Company. This is one of the most important Iraqi telecommunications company that caters to more than 9 million subscribers around Iraq. The result of this was that thousands of Chopy's (Asia Cell) billboards were placed around Iraq.

Chopy has performed in Germany, Sweden, the United Kingdom, the Netherlands, Norway, Austria,  Greece, the United States, Canada, Australia, Ukraine and the United Arab Emirates. In the Kurdish populated areas of Turkey, Iran, Iraq, Syria, Armenia and Azerbaijan, she is one of the most famous singers (according to Turkish newspaper Habertürk ). Thousands of her CDs have been sold around the world. Uniquely of Chopy is the fact that she is known in different parts of Kurdistan because she sings in Kurdish-Sorani (native) and Kurdish-Kurmanci (according to the Dutch newspaper NRC Next). Thus she gave concerts throughout Kurdistan: in Diyarbakir (Amed), Batman, Arbil (Erbil/Hawler), Qamishlo, Sulaimaniyah and Van.

Chopy was one of the first singers to perform in the Iraqi city of Kirkuk after the fall off Saddam's dictatorship. Chopy stated that she did so because of her love for her hometown and her many fans (according to the Dutch newspaper Algemeen Dagblad). Many of Chopy Fatah's concerts and music events have been attended by important Iraqi and Kurdish politicians like the President of the Republic of Iraq, Jalal Talabani and the president of the Kurdistan Region, Massoud Barzani.

Chopy supported in 2009 the Democratic Society Party DTP (the current BDP Peace and Democracy Party) by sending an official letter to its leader Ahmet Türk where she explained that she will do everything in her power to support the peaceful solution of the Kurdish issue in Turkey (North-Kurdistan). “As a Kurdish artist I want to show my support to the solution of the Kurdish question in North-Kurdistan (Southeast Turkey).”  Chopy said she is willing to give free concerts in Diyarbakır (Amed), Cizîr, Batman and other cities to support peace. Chopy was one of the Kurdish singers that held concerts in Iraqi Kurdistan to raise money for the Kurdish victims of the Van earthquake that struck the city in southeastern Turkey in October 2011 (2011 Van earthquake). On 21 March 2013 she held a performance in the Turkish Kurdistani city of Diyarbakır (Amed) in front of 2 million people to support peace and freedom for the Kurds in Turkey.

In October 2013 Chopy was chosen to be the Kurdish flag bearer for the One Young World Summit' in Johannesburg, South Africa. The Kurdish flag was for the first time hoisted at the event, alongside flags of 190 other countries attending the summit.

Advertisement

Chopy's music & advertisement videos are played on different TV channels in the Middle East:
 Qatar – Arabic  : Al Jazeera
 Iraq – Arabic  : Al Arabiya, Al Sharqiya, Al-Baghdadia TV, Al Iraqiya and Al Sumaria
 Iraq – Kurdish   : Kurdistan TV, KurdSat, Kurdish News Network (KNN), Zagros TV, Gali Kurdistan, Kanal4, KOREK TV, VIN TV, Kurdmax, NRT2, Rudaw TV
 UAE – Arabic  : Middle East Broadcasting Center (MBC)
 UAE – Persian  : Persian Music Channel (PMC)
 Iran – Kurdish   : TISHK TV, Rojhelat TV, KBC, Newroz TV, KLIK SAT, KOMALA TV
 Turkey – Kurdish   : Roj TV, Sterk TV, MMC TV, TRT 6, Kurd1 Channel, Dünya TV,
 Lebanon and Egypt – Arabic   : Melody Music
 Syria – Kurdish   : Ronahî TV

Discography

2003 – Çît Naw Binêm
 02. Siya Cemane
 03. Legel Xem
 04. Yara Min
 05. Le Mehzunan
 06. Xosewistekem
 07. Hevala Min
 08. Xemi Duri
 09. Seydayi

2007 – Nawit Denem Jino
 01. Gwe Nagirim
 02. Serbesti
 03. Hedi Hedi
 04. Bimbexse
 05. Xak
 06. Isqa Mezin
 07. De Birro
 08. Zistani Ruhh
 09. Day Wele Nabe, Semame
 10. Ere Bazo, Neki
 11. Be Soz
 12. Grftar
 13. Kirkuk

2010 – Crystal
 01. Hewilmede
 02. Kiristal
 03. Be tu nagem
 04. Disan
 05. Eshqe diwar ninin
 06. Meysharewe
 07. Mire peyvan
 08. Ho ew kesey

2011 – Şara
 01. Le Paş Mergim
 02. Nemam
 03. Lanik Jînan
 04. Beqûrban
 05. Sefer
 06. Nemirdim Min
 07. Ehmedî Mala Mûsa
 08. Evînê
 09. Le Derîyawe
 10. Loy Nemayîme
 11. Lawkê Metînê
 12. Bûlbûl Exwênê

2012 – Baran
 01. Awir Dewe
 02. Baran
 03. Wenegir
 04. Diltengiyekanim
 05. Tirsi Mergawi
 06. Rojgar
 07. Yar
 08. Xweneri Tenya
 09. Diro
 10. Baran (Unplugged Version)

2017 – Bnar
 01. To Siareki
 02. Lem Ziz Mebe (Zana Remix)
 03. Be Yadi Towe
 04. Hat U Cu
 05. Heqi Xote
 06. Bot Nusiwm
 07. Copi
 08. Barana
 09. Dem Ewareye
 10. Tube Bit
 11. Lem Ziz Mebe
 12. Daya Gian (Dillin Hoox Collab)
 13. Copi (Renas Miran Remix)

Singles
 01. Think of me
 02. Draw the line
 03. My Homeland

References

External links

 Official website of Chopy Fatah
 Chopy's newspaper interview – Kurdish Globe (English)
 Chopy's newspaper interview – Algemeen Dagblad (Dutch)
 Report about Chopy on Dutch Television – EenVandaag (Dutch)
 Report about Chopy on Dutch Television – Goudmijn (Dutch)
 Chopy on Dutch TV programme Raymanns Suikerfeest – from min 39(Dutch)
 Chopy in an AsiaCell advertisement

People from Kirkuk
Iraqi Kurdish women
Kurdish-language singers
Living people
Iraqi emigrants to the Netherlands
Dutch people of Kurdish descent
1983 births
21st-century Iraqi women singers
Kurdish women singers
English language singers from Iraq

https://karwan.tv/